Vicini di casa was an Italian sitcom aired on TV network Italia 1.

The comedy theme based in the everyday lives of an Italian most common melting pot, Italians of southern Italy origins (more traditional) living in a big modern city in northern Italy, namely Milan.

Cast
 Silvio Orlando: Orlando Bauscia
 Teo Teocoli: Teo Bauscia
 Gene Gnocchi: Eugenio Tortelli
 Gabriella Golia: Herself
 Enzo Cannavale: Doorman

See also
List of Italian television series

References

External links
 

Italian television series
1991 Italian television series debuts
1992 Italian television series debuts
Italia 1 original programming